Dragonwyck is a 1946 American period drama film made by Twentieth Century-Fox. It was directed by Joseph L. Mankiewicz, and produced by Darryl F. Zanuck and Ernst Lubitsch (uncredited), from a screenplay by Mankiewicz, based on the novel Dragonwyck by Anya Seton. The music score was by Alfred Newman, and the cinematography by Arthur C. Miller. The film stars Gene Tierney, Walter Huston, and Vincent Price.

Plot summary
Raised in 1844 Greenwich, Connecticut by her strait-laced low church parents, Ephraim (Walter Huston) and Abigail (Anne Revere), Miranda Wells (Gene Tierney) is a farm girl who often daydreams of a more romantic and luxurious life outside the farm. Miranda gets her opportunity when her mother receives a letter from their distant cousin Nicholas Van Ryn (Vincent Price), a wealthy patroon in Hudson, New York. Miranda manages to convince her parents to let her go to Nicholas's estate of Dragonwyck manor as companion to his eight-year-old daughter Katrine (Connie Marshall). Over time, Miranda learns that Nicholas and his wife Johanna are estranged from each other and from their daughter. She also hears from the servants that the Van Ryn bloodline is cursed as only they can hear the harpsichord played by the ghost of Nicholas's great-grandmother Azilde whenever misfortune befalls the family.

Meeting an Anti-Rent supporter named Dr. Jeff Turner while secretly attending the tenant farmers' Kermesse with Katrine, Miranda witnesses Nicholas evicting a discontented farmer named Klaas Bleecker for refusing to participate in the annual rent-paying ceremony. A few days later, Klaas is accused of murder. Nicholas ungraciously assents to Turner's request that the farmer be given a fair trial, in return for which he insists the doctor attend to his ailing wife Johanna. Although Johanna is diagnosed with a simple cold, she dies unexpectedly of acute gastritis from eating cake.

Nicholas later confesses to Miranda that he was unhappy with his wife for not bearing him a son after being rendered infertile by the birth of Katrine. At the same time, he admits having romantic feelings for Miranda. Miranda returns the sentiment, but returns to Greenwich to put some distance between them. Two months later, Nicholas arrives and asks for her hand in marriage. Ephraim and Abigail reluctantly consent, and Miranda becomes pregnant not long after the wedding. Nicholas is thrilled by the news, though he quarrels with her over her simple faith in a God as the semi-feudal system of patroon land ownership and tenancy crumbled around him. However, when their baby is revealed to have a defective heart and dies immediately after his baptism, a heartbroken and embittered Nicholas withdraws alone to an attic room at Dragonwyck and becomes a drug addict. Peg O'Malley, Miranda's semi-lame loyal maid, fears for Miranda's life and calls upon Dr. Jeff Turner for help.

Turner arrives as Nicholas is suffering a psychotic episode characterized by auditory hallucinations and realizes that Johanna's death was not an accident; Nicholas poisoned Johanna with a sprig from an Oleander bush he'd sprinkled in her food.

Turner accuses Nicholas of murder and insinuates he is planning to murder Miranda as well. Insulted, Nicholas lunges at Turner and the two brawl on the floor with the younger Turner ultimately knocking Nicholas out. Peggy spirits Miranda away from Nicholas for her safety.

An increasingly volatile and dangerous Nicholas grabs a pistol and goes to the Kermesse grounds in an attempt to revive patroon authority by reliving old tenant rituals, but as if in answer to his fantasies as well as his worst fears, Turner arrives with the tenant farmers, the mayor, and the sheriff and arrests him for the murder of his wife. When he resists arrest and reaches for his gun, Nicholas is shot to death.

Miranda returns accompanied by Turner to her family in Greenwich. As they part, Turner repeats the exact words he spoke when he first tried unsuccessfully to woo Miranda: Can he see her again, he asks? I suppose so, says Miranda."Will a week be too soon? asks Dr. Turner, and the film ends.

Cast
 Gene Tierney as Miranda Wells
 Vincent Price as Nicholas van Ryn
 Walter Huston as Ephraim Wells
 Glenn Langan as Dr. Jeff Turner
 Anne Revere as Abigail Wells
 Spring Byington as Magda
 Connie Marshall as Katrine Van Ryn
 Harry Morgan as Bleecker
 Jessica Tandy as Peggy
 Vivienne Osborne as Johanna Van Ryn
 Trudy Marshall as Elizabeth Van Borden
 Larry Steers as Servant (uncredited)

Production notes
Gregory Peck was the first choice for Nicholas Van Ryn. Ernst Lubitsch was to direct, but became ill, pre-production was delayed, and Peck dropped out.

Reception
Bosley Crowther of The New York Times said: "... Twentieth Century-Fox has fashioned a grand and gloomy mansion as the scene, and has inhabited it with a haughty master of aristocratic Dutch descent. ... Vincent Price gives a picturesque performance as the regal and godless patroon, using his face and his carriage to demonstrate insolence, that's all. Clean shaven and elegantly tailored, he still makes a formidable Bluebeard, and his moments of suave diabolism are about the best in the film. Gene Tierney is fairly ornamental in the role of the tortured child bride, but she plainly creates no more character than the meager script provides. Of the several lesser characters, Walter Huston is most credible as the forthright, God-fearing father of the cardboard heroine."

Adaptations to other media
Dragonwyck was adapted as an hour-long radio play on the October 7, 1946 broadcast of Lux Radio Theater, starring Vincent Price and Gene Tierney. It was dramatized as a half-hour radio play on the January 20, 1947, broadcast of The Screen Guild Theater, starring Vincent Price and Teresa Wright.

See also
 Anti-Rent War

Notes

External links
 
 
 
 
 
 Dragonwick Movie Still
Streaming audio
 Dragonwyck on Lux Radio Theater: October 7, 1946 
 Dragonwyck on Screen Guild Theater: January 20, 1947

1946 films
1940s English-language films
20th Century Fox films
Films about drugs
Films directed by Joseph L. Mankiewicz
Films based on American novels
Films set in 1844
Films set in country houses
American black-and-white films
1946 drama films
Films with screenplays by Joseph L. Mankiewicz
American drama films
1946 directorial debut films
1940s American films